The Saturn Award for Best Streaming Horror & Thriller Series introduced at the 45th Saturn Awards, honoring the best streaming series in the genres of horror and thriller. It was not presented at the 46th Saturn Awards in 2021 but returned for the 47th Saturn Awards in 2022.

(NOTE: Year refers to year of eligibility, the actual ceremonies are held the following year)

Winners and Nominees

References

See also
 Saturn Award for Best Horror Television Series
 Saturn Award for Best New Media Television Series

Awards established in 2019
2019 establishments in the United States
Saturn Awards